Weightlifting at the 2011 Arafura Games took place at the Darwin Entertainment Centre between 10 and 13 May 2011.

Together with that year's Oceania Championships (which also include the South Pacific Championships), they were held concurrently as a single event designated the 2011 Arafura Games & Oceania Championships. Athletes from certain countries were able to contest multiple championships simultaneously (including age-group variants).

There were also two openweight para powerlifting events (one per gender) for disabled athletes.

Medal summary
Results were as follows:

Medal table

Men

Women

Para powerlifting

References

External links
2011 Arafura Games - Weightlifting
Results book (weightlifting only)

Arafura Games
Oceania Weightlifting Championships
Oceania Weightlifting Championships
International weightlifting competitions hosted by Australia
Sport in Darwin, Northern Territory
Oceania Weightlifting Championships